The All Things Go Fall Classic is a Washington D.C.-based annual outdoor music festival. The festival started in 2014 and is produced by the company All Things Go.

The festival was first held at the Union Market in D.C. It expanded to the 15,000 capacity Yards Park at the Capitol Waterfront in 2016, and 20,000 capacity Merriweather Post Pavilion in 2021. The festival is cited for its support and inclusion of LGBT artists, and women-focused lineups.

In 2017, Foster the People, Betty Who, SABA, and Young Thug were featured at the festival. Its 2018 edition featured an all-women lineup, curated by Maggie Rogers and British singer, LPX (Lizzy Plapinger), and headlined by Maggie Rogers, Billie Eilish, and Carly Rae Jepsen. Plapinger commented on how the festival was an opportunity to improve the gender imbalance. The Women's March partnered on the event and facilitated a discussion around female inequality. In 2019, the All Things Go Fall Classic dedicating a day of the festival to female performers. The female-focused nonprofit, She is the Music, was a supporting partner.

References 

Music festivals established in 2011
Music festivals in Washington, D.C.